Atatürk Airport  (former IATA code: IST) is a general aviation airport in Istanbul. It formerly served as the main intercontinental passenger airport and cargo hub for Istanbul until it was closed to commercial passenger flights on 6 April 2019. From that point, all flights were transferred to the new Istanbul Airport. All freight operations subsequently relocated as well by 5 February 2022.

History

Growth and development 
In 1911, a small apron with two hangars was built in Yeşilköy, Istanbul, for the Ottoman Armed Forces. Mustafa Kemal Atatürk founded Türk Tayyare Cemiyeti (Turkish Aircraft Company, today THK Türk Hava Kurumu) in 1925. In 1933, today's Turkish Airlines, the Türkiye Devlet Hava Yolları started its flights with two Curtiss Kingbird aircraft. Flights from Istanbul to Ankara and Athens began. The small apron was expanded and a new passenger terminal was built. This is considered the beginning of the airport's 86-year history. It was originally named Yeşilköy Airport. In the 1980s, it was renamed Atatürk International Airport. 

It served more than 60 million passengers in 2015, making it the 11th-busiest airport in the world in terms of total passenger traffic and the 10th-busiest in the world in terms of international passenger traffic. In 2017, it was Europe's 5th-busiest airport after London–Heathrow, Paris–Charles de Gaulle, Frankfurt Airport, and Amsterdam Airport Schiphol, having fallen from third place after a decline in passengers due to security fears.

Closure 
Istanbul Atatürk Airport was replaced in regards to commercial passenger functions by the newly constructed Istanbul Airport, in April 2019, in order to meet Istanbul's growing domestic and international air traffic demand as a source, destination, and transit point. Both airports were used in parallel for five months from late 2018, with the new airport gradually expanding to serve more domestic and regional destinations. On 6 April 2019, Atatürk's IST IATA airport code was inherited by Istanbul Airport and Atatürk Airport was assigned the code ISL after the full transfer of all scheduled passenger activities to the new airport was completed. The final commercial flight, Turkish Airlines Flight 54, left Atatürk Airport on 6 April 2019 at 2:44am for Singapore.

On 5 February 2022, Turkish Cargo relocated all cargo flights and operations from their former hub at the airport to the new Istanbul Airport.

Atatürk Airport National Garden 
Turkey's government announced its plans to construct a giant park on the grounds of the former Istanbul Atatürk Airport (whose operations are transferred to the new Istanbul Airport) in 2019. The park is part of a larger urban transformation plan that seeks to correct some of the haphazard urban planning that characterised most major Turkish cities since the 1970s. Due to the little space available to construct or expand green spaces, new parks are often constructed on spots formerly occupied by factories or other major facilities.

The Atatürk Airport National Garden will be constructed on and around one of the two runways of Atatürk Airport. This runway was already rendered unusable after it was chosen as the site for Istanbul's pandemic hospital in early 2020. More than 132.500 trees are to be planted in place of the asphalt runway and taxiways that will also help to keep the city cooler. The other runway is set to remain in use for select cargo and private jet flights, aviation fairs (such as Teknofest) and for use with the air force (which still maintains a small training base and museum here).

The leader of the main opposition party CHP Kemal Kılıçdaroğlu called the proposed construction of the park ''treason'' and threatened to hold those responsible to account. The CHP opposes the project on the grounds that it's still a working airport, despite the fact that one runway and dedicated cargo tarmac will remain open and that Kılıçdaroğlu previously announced his own plans to build a park at the airport.

Facilities

Defunct passenger terminals
Istanbul Atatürk Airport featured two passenger terminals linked to each other. The former domestic terminal is the older and smaller of the two terminals and exclusively handled domestic flights within Turkey. It featured its own check-in and airside facilities on the upper floor, with twelve departure gates equipped with jet bridges and five baggage claim belts on the ground level. The former international terminal was inaugurated in 2000 and used for all international flights. It featured a large main hall containing 8 check-in aisles and a wide range of airside facilities such as shops and restaurants, 34 gates equipped with jet bridges, and 7 bus-boarding stands. The arrivals floor had 11 baggage claim belts. In addition, there is a general aviation terminal to the northwest of the passenger terminals.

Defunct cargo terminal
The airport featured a dedicated cargo terminal including facilities for the handling of radioactive and refrigerated freight.

Other facilities
Turkish Airlines has its headquarters in the Turkish Airlines General Management Building, located within the airport campus.
 Prima Aviation Services Inc. has its MRO facilities in new technical site at the air side Gate A.
 In May 2020, the Yeşilköy Prof. Dr. Murat Dilmener Emergency Hospital using the former site of the 35L/35R runways were opened in response to the COVID-19 pandemic in Turkey.

Airlines and destinations
As of April 2019, all passenger operations have been relocated to the new Istanbul Airport. As of February 2022, all cargo operations have been relocated to the new airport as well. Currently, the airport serves only private and business jets as well as operations on behalf of the Government of Turkey.

Statistics

Passenger statistics for Istanbul Atatürk Airport for the years 2002–2019 are below.

Istanbul Atatürk Airport ranked 17th in ACI statistics at the end of 2011 in terms of international traffic with almost 24 million international passengers. It ranked 29th in the world in terms of total passenger traffic with over 37.4 million passengers in 2011. Its total traffic within the last decade more than tripled, and its international traffic quadrupled.

Accidents and incidents

 On 30 January 1975, Turkish Airlines Flight 345, crashed into the Sea of Marmara during its final approach to the airport. All 42 passengers and crew on board were killed.
 On 25 April 2015, Turkish Airlines Flight 1878, operated by an A320-200, TC-JPE was severely damaged in a landing accident. The aircraft aborted the first hard landing, which inflicted engine and gear damage. On the second attempt at landing, the right gear collapsed and the aircraft rolled off the runway spinning 180 degrees. All on board evacuated without injury.
 On 28 June 2016, three terrorists killed 44 civilians by gunfire and subsequent suicide bombings, along with 239 civilians injured. The three men arrived in a taxi cab and opened fire at the terminal. The three men then blew themselves up when police opened fire. The airport has X-ray scanners at the entrance to the terminal but security checks for cars are limited.
 On 15 July 2016, the 2016 Turkish coup d'état attempt took place. During the attempted coup, units of the Turkish Armed Forces seized control of the airport and closed it, but it was reopened after pro-government forces regained control.

Accolades
 The Turkish Chamber of Civil Engineers lists İstanbul Atatürk Airport as one of the fifty civil engineering feats in Turkey, a list of remarkable engineering projects completed in the first 50 years of the chamber's existence.
 In the 2013 Air Transport News awards ceremony, İstanbul Atatürk Airport was named Airport of the Year.
 The airport was named Europe's Best Airport in the 40-50 million passenger per year category at the 2013 Skytrax World Airport Awards.

References

External links

  (archived on 8 February 2020)
 
 

Defunct airports in Turkey
 
1924 establishments in Turkey
Airfields of the United States Army Air Forces Air Transport Command in the European Theater
Ataturk
Bakırköy
Buildings and structures in Istanbul Province
Transport in Istanbul Province
Airports established in 1924
Airports disestablished in 2022
Airport